Pomegranate Orchard is a 2017 Azerbaijani drama film directed by Ilgar Najaf. It was selected as the Azerbaijani entry for the Best Foreign Language Film at the 90th Academy Awards, but it was not nominated.

Plot
Inspired by Anton Chekhov's 1904 play The Cherry Orchard, the film follows a prodigal son who returns after 12 years. His reappearance at the family home in rural Azerbaijan significantly alters their way of life.

Cast
 Hasan Agayev as Jalal
 Samimi Farhad as Gabil
 Ilaha Hasanova as Sara
 Gurban Ismailov as Shamil

See also
 List of submissions to the 90th Academy Awards for Best Foreign Language Film
 List of Azerbaijani submissions for the Academy Award for Best Foreign Language Film

References

External links
 
 Pomegranate Orchard (2017)

2017 films
2017 drama films
Azerbaijani drama films
Azerbaijani-language films